João Pedro Salazar da Graça (born 18 June 1995 in Porto) is a Portuguese footballer who plays for Rio Ave as a midfielder.

Club career
On 10 November 2013, Graça made his professional debut with FC Porto B in a 2013–14 Segunda Liga match against União Madeira replacing Leandro Silva in the 65th minute.

UD Oliveirense announced on 25 January 2019, that they had signed Graça on a contract until the end of the season.

On 25 August 2021, he signed a one-year contract with Rio Ave.

References

External links

Stats and profile at LPFP 

1995 births
Living people
Sportspeople from Matosinhos
Portuguese footballers
Association football midfielders
Liga Portugal 2 players
Primeira Liga players
Padroense F.C. players
FC Porto B players
C.D. Feirense players
F.C. Arouca players
Leixões S.C. players
C.D. Mafra players
Rio Ave F.C. players